Hibiscus taiwanensis, or the Taiwan cotton rose, is a native plant in Taiwan, which lives in China and low altitude in Taiwan. It is a species of plant in the Malvaceae family. The form of flower is different from Hibiscus mutabilis in China, which is double. It can attract butterflies.

Botany
Hibiscus taiwanensis can grow to 3–5 meters. The leaves are broad ovate to circular, 7–10 cm long and 6–8 cm broad; simple leaves with long petioles about 10–16 cm ; arranged in alternate; subcampanulate corolla, 6–9 in diameter. Its bloom season is in August to October; fruits form in November to December. In the early morning, the flowers are white, but they turn light pink by noon and become an even deeper pink in the afternoon.

Hibiscus taiwanensis is a light-demanding plant; it needs much sunlight. It is drought-enduring and resistant to pollution and barren soil.

Use
The wood of Hibiscus taiwanensis can be made into clogs.

References

山芙蓉-- 中央研究院數位典藏資源網 
台灣野生植物資料庫
台灣大百科全書
台灣植物誌

taiwanensis